Alpha Males is a Spanish comedy television series created by brother-and-sister team Alberto and Laura Caballero, for Netflix. It stars Fernando Gil, María Hervás, Raúl Tejón, Kira Miró, Gorka Otxoa, Paula Gallego, Fele Martínez, and Raquel Guerrero, and was produced by the Caballero siblings' own production company, Contubernio Films. The show premiered on 30 December 2022.

Synopsis
The series follows four men in their forties who begin to notice their male privilege disappearing with social change and the empowerment of women, and they are forced to adapt, each in their own way.

Cast and characters
 Fernando Gil as Pedro Aguilar
 María Hervás as Daniela Galván
 Raúl Tejón as Raúl Camacho
 Kira Miró as Luz
 Gorka Otxoa as Santi
 Paula Gallego as Álex
 Fele Martínez as Luis Bravo
 Raquel Guerrero as Esther

Production
The series concept was created shortly after the end of the lockdown imposed due to the COVID-19 pandemic. After completing filming for the twelfth season of La que se avecina, and given the impossibility of resuming the third season of El pueblo due to the difficulty of traveling between autonomous communities, the Caballero siblings, together with co-writers Daniel Deorador and Araceli Álvarez de Sotomayor, began to develop ideas for a new series. The team decided to create a show about middle-aged men's reactions to social changes. With the permission of Mediaset España, who co-owned Contubernio Films, the four writers brought the series to Netflix, who had already shown interest in collaborating with the Caballero siblings.

Alpha Males was first announced in March 2022, as the first series by the Caballeros exclusively for a streaming platform. In July 2022, the show's cast was revealed, and it was confirmed that filming had completed.

Release
On 21 November 2022, Netflix released the first images from the series and confirmed that it would premiere on its platform on 30 December 2022.

References

External links
 
 

2020s Spanish television series
2022 Spanish television series debuts
2020s Spanish comedy television series
Spanish-language Netflix original programming
Television shows set in Spain
Television shows filmed in Spain